The Puroik language, sometimes known as Sulung, is a possible language isolate spoken by the Puroik people of Arunachal Pradesh in India and of Lhünzê County, Tibet, in China.

Besides their own language, the Puroik also use Nishi, Hindi, and Assamese. Literacy is very low, at about 2%. Those who are literate use either the Bengali script, Devanagari or the Latin alphabet to write Puroik.

Geographical distribution
Remsangpuia (2008:17) listed a limited number of Puroik villages. Currently, Puroik are seen inhabiting the following districts and circles of Arunachal Pradesh. They also live in Nyishi, Aka, and Miji areas.

East Kameng District: Chayangtajo, Pipu, Pakke Kessang, Lada, Bameng, Seijosa, Seppa, Sawa, Khenewa, and Pipu-Dipu circles (about 70 villages)
Pakke-Kessang District: Pakke-Kessang and Seijosa circles
Kurung Kumey District: Koloriang, Sarli, Damin, Parsi Parlo, Nyapin, Phassang, and Paniasang circles
Kra Daadi District: Palin, Tali, and Pipsorang circles
Papum Pare District
West Kameng District
Upper Subansiri District: Taksing circle

According to the Ethnologue, Puroik is spoken in 53 villages along the Par River in Arunachal Pradesh.

The Puroik are located from the Upper Subansiri River drainage basin (西巴霞区) to the Tawang River drainage basin (Li 2005). There are about 3,000 Puroik as of 2002, who are classified as ethnic Lhoba by the Chinese government.

Dialects
Lieberherr (2015) consider Puroik to be a dialect chain where geographically distant dialects are mutually unintelligible, whereas dialects located close to each other are mutually intelligible. The internal diversity of Puroik is about equal to that of the Western Kho-Bwa branch. Lieberherr (2015) and Lieberherr & Bodt (2017) list the following dialects of Puroik, provided here in geographical order from east to west.
Kurung-Kumey dialect: spoken in Kurung Kumey district, which is located to the east of Chayangtajo. May be most similar to the Puroik dialect described in Li Daqin (2004) and other Chinese sources.
Chayangtajo dialect: spoken in Sanchu and neighboring villages of Chayangtajo circle, East Kameng district, Arunachal Pradesh, India by a few hundred speakers.
Lasumpatte dialect: spoken in Lasumpatte village in Seijosa near the Assam border. Most inhabitants have recently migrated from the Chayangtajo area.
Sario-Saria dialect: spoken in three villages by a few hundred speakers.
Rawa dialect: spoken in several villages in and around Rawa by a few hundred speakers (located between Chayangtajo and Kojo-Rojo). Also includes Poube village.Kojo-Rojo dialect: spoken in the villages of Kojo and Rojo, and possibly also in Jarkam village (mutually intelligible with the Puroik dialect spoken in other villages in Lada circle).
Bulu dialect: spoken only in Bulu village by 7–20 speakers.

Classification
Lieberherr & Bodt (2017) classify Puroik as Kho-Bwa, and has traditionally been considered to be a Sino-Tibetan language. There is some mutual intelligibility with Bugun, and Burling (2003) grouped it with Bugun and Sherdukpen, and possibly with Lish and Sartang.

James A. Matisoff (2009) considers Puroik to be a Tibeto-Burman language that has undergone sound changes such as:
Proto-Tibeto-Burman nasals > voiced stops
Proto-Tibeto-Burman *-a > -i

Lieberherr (2015) also considers Puroik to be a Tibeto-Burman language, although he notes that it has likely borrowed from non-Tibetan-Burman languages. However, Roger Blench (2011) considers Puroik to be a language isolate.

Grammar
The Puroik grammar notes here have been adapted primarily from Tayeng (1990).

Number
Number is not considered a grammatical feature in Puroik. Plurality is expressed, when required to be stated clearly by huangda, meaning all, many, etc.

Gender
There is no grammatical gender in Puroik. However the two sexes are distinguished when necessary. To indicate other relatives and persons the suffix -aphu is added for the male and -amua for the female. Demonstrative, and Interrogative.

Case
Seven cases may be distinguished: Subject (Nominative), Object (Accusative), Instrumental, Dative (Purposive), Ablative, Possessive (Genitive), and Locative.

Pronoun
The Personal Pronoun distinguished three persons (the first person, second person, and third person) and two numbers (singular and plural). The same form is used for both genders.

Adjective
There are four types of adjectives: adjective of quality, adjective of quantity, demonstrative adjective, interrogative adjective.

Verb
Puroik verbs do not indicate number and person. The three principal tenses (present, past, and future), including the indefinite and the continuous are indicated by means of particles used as suffixes. There are four moods: Imperative, potential, conditional, and subjunctive. 
Imperative uses the suffix -bo, -da, and -ge for commands.
Potential uses the suffix -pa to express the ability to perform.
Conditional uses -re/-hangra to express obligation.

Adverb
Adverbs may be distinguished into four classes: Time, place, manner, and interrogative.

Vocabulary
The following list of 181 words in three Puroik dialects, in addition to Proto-Puroik (the reconstructed proto-language of the Puroik lects), is from Lieberherr (2015: 280–286). Lieberherr (2015) reconstructs Proto-Puroik, drawing data from the Chayangtajo dialect and the newly described Kojo-Rojo and Bulu dialects. Forms from the Rawa and Saria dialects have also been included.

References

Deuri, R.K. 1982. The Sulungs. Shillong: Government of Arunachal Pradesh.
Remsangphuia. 2008. Puroik phonology. Shillong: Don Bosco Technical School.
Li Daqin [李大勤]. 2004. A study of Sulung [苏龙语研究]. Beijing: Ethnic Publishing House.
Lieberherr, Ismael. 2015. A progress report on the historical phonology and affiliation of Puroik. In Linda Konnerth and Stephen Morey and Priyankoo Sarmah and Amos Teo (eds.), North East Indian Linguistics (NEIL) 7, 235–286. Canberra: Asia-Pacific Linguistics Open Access.

Further reading
Pertin, David. 2005. "The Puroiks (Sulungs) of Arunachal Pradesh." In Primitive Tribes in Contemporary India: Concept, Ethnography and Demography 1, edited by Sarit Kumar Chaudhuri and Sucheta Sen Chaudhuri, 367–378. New Delhi: Mittal.
Dutta, Sristidhar, and Tana Showren. 2008. "A Case Study of the Sulungs (Puroiks)." In: Blisters on their feet: tales of internally displaced persons in India's North East, edited by Samir Kumar Das, 59–68. Los Angeles and New Delhi: Sage.
Lieberherr, Ismael. 2017. Grammar of Bulu Puroik''. Ph.D. dissertation, University of Bern.
Stonor, C. R. (1952). The Sulung Tribe of the Assam Himalayas. Anthropos, (5/6), 947. doi:10.2307/41104369
Tayeng, Aduk. 1990. Sulung language guide. Shillong: The Director of Information and Public Relations, Arunachal Pradesh.

External links
Puroik Language
Resources Tab (Sulung phrasebook)
Text Sulung Good News Christina Story (text)
Audio Sulung Good News Christian Story (audio)

Kho-Bwa languages
Languages of India
Language isolates of Asia